Lewis Mitchell "Mickey" Clark (November 26, 1923 – September 17, 2003) was a provincial politician from Alberta, Canada. He served as a member of the Legislative Assembly of Alberta from 1979 to 1986 sitting with the Progressive Conservative caucus in government.

Political career
Clark ran for a seat to the Legislative Assembly of Alberta as a Progressive Conservative candidate in the Drumheller electoral district for the 1979 Alberta general election. He defeated four other candidates in a hotly contested race to pick up the seat for his party.

Clark ran for a second term in the Assembly in the 1982 Alberta general election. He was easily returned to office defeated two other candidates with a landslide majority.

He retired from provincial level politics at dissolution of the assembly in 1986.

References

External links
Alberta Legislative Assembly Membership list

Progressive Conservative Association of Alberta MLAs
2003 deaths
1923 births